The Rio Madeira Sustainable Yield Forest is a set of managed forests in the state of Rondônia, Brazil.
Three sectors, A, B and C, were created in 1990 but only sectors B and C remain.
The forests have not been managed in a sustainable manner.

General

The Rio Madeira A, B and C sustainable yield forests were created in 1990, among eight state forests created that year on the left bank of the Madeira River. The others were the Rio Vermelho A, B, C and D sustainable yield forests and the Rio Abunã Sustainable Yield Forest
In 1992 the state of Rondônia agreed to implement the Agricultural and Forestry Plan of Rondônia (Planafloro) under a loan agreement with the International Bank for Reconstruction and Development (IBRD).
However, during the 1990s the Rondônia government took no effective measures to implement the forests.
The Rondônia executive has tended to see development and conservation as incompatible, and has placed development first, opening roads and waterways and allowing occupation and unsustainable use of land.

On 31 August 2000 the Instituto Nacional de Colonização e Reforma Agrária (INCRA – National Institute for Colonization and Agrarian Reform)  transferred 19 federal public lands in state conservation units to the state government, including the Rio Madeira A, B and C sustainable yield forests.
Law 233/00 of 2000 redefined zoning and eliminated about 70% of the protected areas.
Three forests were reduced and three ignored, leaving .
The remaining forests were not protected and were subject to invasions.
Since then, various people were given ownership documents in Rio Madeira B by INCRA or the Porto Velho department of agriculture.
The Banco da Amazônia released funds for agricultural activities within the forests.

Sector A

The land could be declared of public utility and expropriated if the management guidelines were not met. The Rondônia Institute of Land and Colonisation could enter into agreements with public and private enterprises to implement the technical and scientific purposes of the forest.
This conservation unit appears to have disappeared after 2000.

Sector B

The Rio Madeira Sustainable Yield Forest (B) is in the municipality of Porto Velho, Rondônia.
The forest originally covered , but this was reduced due to the presence of private land titles in the area.
The Rio Madeira Sustainable Yield Forest (B) was recreated by decree 7600 of 8 October 1996 with an area of about  under the State Secretariat of State for Environmental Development for the application.
The goal was self-sustaining production of renewable natural resources and natural regeneration of the remaining vegetation to ensure the productive capacity of the forest with minimal alternation of ecosystems.

On 1 December 2010 the federal government transferred the Rio Madeira B property to the state.
A 2012 analysis of deforestation in the sector B unit using satellite images showed that the goal of sustainability was not being achieved.
On 19 February 2014 legislative decree 508 revoked the decree 7.600 that had created the forest.
The decree revoking creation was itself suspended as unconstitutional on 14 April 2014, and this decision was upheld on 2 May 2016.

Sector C

It was subject to the Rondônia State Forestry Institute (Instituto Estadual de Florestas de Rondônia), a state agency linked to the Secretariat of State for the Environment.
The land could be declared of public utility and expropriated if the management guidelines were not met. The State Forestry Institute could enter into agreements with public and private enterprises to meet the technical and scientific purposes of the forest.
The Rio Madeira Sustainable Yield Forest (C) is in the municipality of Porto Velho, Rondônia.
The forest is the southeast of the BR-319 highway, north of the city of Porto Velho.
90% of the forest overlaps with the central section of the Cuniã Ecological Station.
The vegetation is 100% savanna-rainforest contact.

Notes

Sources

Protected areas of Rondônia
1990 establishments in Brazil
State forests of Brazil
Protected areas established in 1990